Koseč (Italian: Cossis) is a small settlement above Drežnica in the Municipality of Kobarid in the Littoral region of Slovenia.

A small church in the settlement dedicated to Saint Justus dates to the second half of the 14th century, making it one of the oldest surviving churches in the Soča area.  It is built of travertine and its interior is covered in frescos from the late 15th century.

References

External links
Koseč on Geopedia

Populated places in the Municipality of Kobarid